Svenska Cupen 2008 was the fifty-third season of the main Swedish football Cup. The competition started on March 20, 2008 and concluded on September 21, 2008 with the Final, held at Fredriksskans, Kalmar. The final was decided on a penalty shootout that IFK Göteborg won 5–4 against Kalmar FF.

First round
The matches were played between March 20 and April 12, 2008.

!colspan="3"|20 March 2008

|-
!colspan="3"|29 March 2008

|-
!colspan="3"|2 April 2008

|-
!colspan="3"|4 April 2008

|-
!colspan="3"|5 April 2008

|-
!colspan="3"|6 April 2008

|-
!colspan="3"|22 April 2008

|}
1Akropolis IF withdrew from the competition.

Second round
In this round entered winners from the previous round as well as all teams from Allsvenskan and Superettan. The matches were played between April 23 and May 1, 2008.

!colspan="3"|23 April 2008

|-
!colspan="3"|29 April 2008

|-
!colspan="3"|30 April 2008

|-
!colspan="3"|1 May 2008

|}

Third round
In this round entered winners from the previous round. The matches were played between May 14 and 18, 2008.

|-
!colspan="3"|14 May 2008

|-
!colspan="3"|15 May 2008

|-
!colspan="3"|16 May 2008

|-
!colspan="3"|17 May 2008

|-
!colspan="3"|18 May 2008

|}

Fourth round
The matches were played on June 25, 26 and 28, 2008.

!colspan="3"|25 June 2008

|-
!colspan="3"|26 June 2008

|-
!colspan="3"|28 June 2008

|}

Quarter-finals

Semi-finals

Final

External links
 Official site 

2008
Cupen
2008 domestic association football cups